Martin Derganc (born 20 March 1977 in Novo Mesto) is a Slovenian former professional road cyclist.

Career achievements

Major results

1997
 1st Krka Grand Prix
1999
 1st Coppa della Pace
2000
 1st  Overall Tour de Slovénie
 1st  Overall Tour of Croatia
1st Stage 2
 1st Krka Grand Prix
 4th Time trial, National Road Championships
2001
 1st  Road race, National Road Championships
 2nd Overall Tour de Slovénie
 3rd Vlaamse Havenpijl
 7th Rund um Düren
 9th Overall Brixia Tour
 9th Overall Tour of Austria
 10th Tre Valli Varesine
2002
 1st Stage 4 Tour of Austria
2003
 1st  Overall Brixia Tour
1st Stage 2

Grand Tour general classification results timeline

References

1977 births
Living people
Slovenian male cyclists
Sportspeople from Novo Mesto